Arixenia camura is a species of earwigs, one of two species in the genus Arixenia. Found in the hollows of trees but not in caves.

References 

Insects described in 1974
Arixeniina